"Lawn Gnome Beach Party of Terror" is the second broadcast episode of the animated television series Phineas and Ferb. In the episode, stepbrothers Phineas and Ferb construct an elaborate beach complex in order to survive the intense heat wave that has struck their city. Meanwhile, the boys' pet platypus, Perry, successfully halts the destruction of all the lawn gnomes in the tri-state area by his nemesis, Dr. Heinz Doofenshmirtz.

"Lawn Gnome Beach Party of Terror" was written by series co-creators Dan Povenmire and Jeff "Swampy" Marsh, who collaborated with Bobby Gaylor and Martin Olson, and directed by Povenmire. The episode originally aired on Disney Channel in the United States on September 28, 2007 as the second of two previews for the series. Since airing, the episode has received generally positive reviews, especially for the originality of its title. Fan reaction was also favorable, and the featured musical number "Backyard Beach" was voted the number 2 song in the series by viewers during the "Phineas and Ferb's Musical Cliptastic Countdown" event.

Voice cast
 Vincent Martella as Phineas Flynn
 Ashley Tisdale as Candace Flynn
 Thomas Sangster as Ferb Fletcher
 Caroline Rhea as Linda Flynn-Fletcher, Additional Voices
 Alyson Stoner as Isabella Garcia-Shapiro, Jenny, Additional Voices
 Mitchel Musso as Additional Voices
 Dan Povenmire as Dr. Heinz Doofenshmirtz, Additional Voices
 Jeff "Swampy" Marsh as Major Monogram, Additional Voices
 Dee Bradley Baker as Perry the Platypus, Mr. Doofenshmirtz, Yodeler, Additional Voices
 Bobby Gaylor as Buford Van Stomm, Additional Voices
 Kelly Hu as Stacy Hirano 
 Keone Young as Dancer, Additional Voices

Plot summary
Due to an intense heat wave striking Danville, Phineas and Ferb are exhausted and do nothing but rest in their backyard. Eventually, they  decide to build a beach in their backyard to spite a morning radio DJ. Candace wants to expose them to their mother for doing so, but she only sees their initial draft of a small sandbox with water and brushes it off. Some time later, they successfully construct a full-scale beach, to which everyone in the neighborhood, including Isabella and her troop of girl scouts the Fireside Girls go to cool off and enjoy themselves. Candace sees this and once again is set to inform their mother. When her friends Stacy and Jenny came over to the backyard beach, this mood soon changes when she finds out that Jeremy, a boy for whom she has romantic feelings for, will be coming to the beach to surf so she decides to stay. She finds pleasure in the beach after being crowned "Queen Wahini" following an accidentally flawless limbo performance and catches the attention of Jeremy.

Meanwhile, Perry investigates the recent theft of lawn gnomes across the tri-state area by Dr. Doofenshmirtz. He enters Doofenshmirtz's underground lair and is immediately captured where Doofenshmirtz explains via video that his family fell to poverty during his youth which results in the repossession of their lawn-gnome which  protects them from black magic. Believing his family to be unprotected, Doofenshmirtz's father forced his son to dress as a lawn gnome and stand in front of their garden the entire day, unable to move and he became like the Statue of Liberty in New York City. For his hardship, Doofenshmirtz seeks revenge and plans on destroying all of the lawn gnomes he has stolen using his new invention: The "destruct-inator". Perry soon breaks out of his trap, and begins to brawl with the mad scientist, which inadvertently causes the machine containing all of the gnomes to malfunction.

The machine releases all of the lawn gnomes and they erupt onto the beach. The beach goers flee in panic of "gnomeageddon" and the beach is destroyed. Candace does not realize this as she is trying to convince her mother not to come in and ruin her good time, so when she tries to justify the beach's existence, she finds nothing but their normal backyard. She is depressed, but the boys find the day to be a successful one. Candace is helped inside by Isabella and Linda. At the end, the DJ from the beginning congratulates Phineas and Ferb and also says that tomorrow will be hot and sunny too, but then Ferb adds "with a slight chance of scattered lawn gnomes", to which Phineas laughs. There is then a zoom-out as the gnomes that crashed into the Flynn-Fletcher household roof are seen.

Production

"Lawn Gnome Beach Party of Terror" was written by Phineas and Ferb co-creators Dan Povenmire and Jeff "Swampy" Marsh, who collaborated with Bobby Gaylor and Martin Olson in order to pen their script. Povenmire would also continue to provide direction based on the teleplay. It was originally broadcast as the second of two special previews of the series on Disney Channel on September 28, 2007, at 10:45 p.m., Eastern/Pacific Time.

Disney Channel released a press release for the episode on September 19, 2007. The announcement contained a summary of a B-Plot which did not appear in the episode's final broadcast. The plot detailed the boys' father, Lawrence, taking advantage of the recent inclusion of sand in his backyard to search for a rare bottle cap. In doing so, Lawrence forms a bond with the boys' friend Baljeet, who is also a collector of such rare novelties.

Actor Vincent Martella, who voices Phineas, cited "Lawn Gnome Beach Party of Terror" as a highlight of working on the series. In an article for Popstar! Magazine, Martella detailed an experience on New Year's Eve, where while watching a repeat of the episode with his family members, he noticed both his ten-year-old brother and his adult relatives laughing. He opted that the experience "the greatest thing in the world."

The episode was among four Phineas and Ferb episodes that were adapted for the 2008 Disney Channel special event "Spot the Diff." The event featured Doofenshmirtz using his "Change-inator-inator" to alter scenes from selected episodes of the series, which the viewer was urged to notice in order to participate in an online quiz. When aired in the marathon, the episode was unaltered, but was preceded by a changed episode entitled "Lawn Gnome Beach Party of Error."

"Lawn Gnome Beach Party of Terror" became available on the DVD compilation Phineas and Ferb: The Fast and the Phineas in 2008, along with fellow first-season episodes "One Good Scare Ought to Do It!" (which had not yet aired in the US) "The Fast and the Phineas," "Are You My Mummy?" "Flop Starz," "Raging Bully," "Lights! Candace! Action!" and "It's About Time!" A bonus feature on the DVD consisted of a game based on the episode entitled "Whack-A-Gnome," in which the player hits gnomes as they pop up from a machine in the style of Whac-A-Mole. The official Phineas and Ferb soundtrack, released in 2009, featured the song "Backyard Beach" from the episode. In 2009, the online retailer Zazzle released several pieces of merchandising materiel based on the episode.

Reception
"Lawn Gnome Beach Party of Terror" received generally positive reviews from television critics. Several critics praised the unique and obscure title; DVD Talk reviewer David Cornelius wrote that it "wins major awesomeness points." Similarly, Jim Thomas of DVD Verdict observed that no "description could possibly do justice" to it. Writing for DVD Town, reviewer James Plath considered the flashback to Doofenshmirtz's youth as a lawn gnome an example of "the deliciously twisted humor of Povenmire and Marsh." In contrast, however, Ed Liu of Toon Zone was critical of the episode and other early episodes available on The Fast and the Phineas, calling them "way too manic for their own good, never giving a gag enough time to develop a proper laugh before ripping off to the next one, and refusing to sit still for any length of time."

Fan reaction for the episode was considerably positive and the song "Backyard Beach" has been considered a "popular number" from the series wide variety of musical pieces. In the 2009 television event "Phineas and Ferb's Musical Cliptastic Countdown," voters ranked it the series' second best musical feature.

References

External links
"Lawn Gnome Beach Party of Terror" at the Internet Movie Database

2007 American television episodes
Phineas and Ferb episodes